The 92nd district of the Texas House of Representatives consists of a portion of Tarrant County. The current Representative is Salman Bhojani, who has represented the district since 2023.

References 

92